Pedro López Ramos (born 6 May 1979) is a Spanish football manager who currently manages the Mexico women's national football team.

Career
In 2011, López became the manager for the Spain U-16 women's national team.

In 2014, it was announced that López would become the head coach for Spain U19. 

In 2021, López was appointed as manager of the Spain U17, Spain U19, Spain U20. 

In 2022, López was named manager of Mexico.

Honours
Spain U19
 UEFA Women's Under-19 Euro: 2022

Spain U20
FIFA U-20 Women's World Cup: 2022; runners-up: 2018

References

External links
 
 

1979 births
Living people
Spanish football managers
Women's national association football team managers
Mexico women's national football team managers